Confinement may refer to

 With respect to humans:
 An old-fashioned or archaic synonym for childbirth
 Postpartum confinement (or postnatal confinement), a system of recovery after childbirth, involving rest and special foods
 Civil confinement for psychiatric patients
 Solitary confinement, a strict form of imprisonment
 Home care supported living
 The confinement of an animal specimen in a zoo
 In physics:
 Color confinement, the physical principle explaining the non-observation of color charged particles like free quarks
 Confinement of thermonuclear plasmas, as a requirement to obtain fusion energy
 Confined liquid, by pores or similar
 Quantum confinement